Ononetin is a natural product from the deoxybenzoin group, which is found in the Russian traditional medicine plant Ononis spinosa. It acts as an inhibitor of the transient receptor potential ion channel TRPM3 and has analgesic effects in animal studies, as well as being used for research into the role of TRPM3 in the immune system dysfunction associated with chronic fatigue syndrome.

References 

Ion channel blockers
Phenyl compounds